Gabriela Coneo (born ) is a Colombian volleyball player. She is part of the Colombia women's national volleyball team.

Career
With Bolivar, she won the 2010 National Championship. She won the silver medal in the 2011 Colombia Junior Championship, representing Bolivar.

She won the 2013 Colombian Championship in the senior category with Bolivar. She won the 2014 U22 South American Championship silver medal and Best Outside Hitter award She helped her national team to end up in the sixth place in the volleyball tournament held in the 2014 Central American and Caribbean Games in Veracruz, Mexico.

She participated in the 2015 FIVB Volleyball World Grand Prix. On club level she played for Liga Bolivarense in 2015. Coneo partnered with Paula Martínez to win the silver medal of the 2016 King of Kings Beach Volleyball Tournament.

References

1993 births
Living people
Colombian women's volleyball players
Sportspeople from Cartagena, Colombia
20th-century Colombian women
21st-century Colombian women